The Lavedan (in Gascon eth/lo Lavedan, /et/lu laβedã/), or occasionally vallées des Gaves, denotes a mountainous natural region of France, located at the heart of the Pyrénées, and forms a group of valleys upstream of Lourdes.

The Lavedan is historically part of the Gascony province and of the county of Bigorre. Today, it is situated in the Hautes-Pyrénées department in the Occitanie region.

Etymology 
The name "Lavedan" is documented under ancient forms: in pago Lavetanense (v. 860), Levitanensis vicecomes (v. 980), vicecomites Levitanicæ vallis (v. 1060), Ramundus de Levitania (1095), homines Baredgie et Levitani (v. 1110), A. de Laueda (1114), Aramon Garsie de Lavedan (1283), terram de Lavedaa (1285).

Il is made up of the Latin -etan, -itan suffix, typically present in names of iberian peoples. Le radical est Lau- / Leu-.

Geography

Topography 
The Lavedan is made up of 7 valleys, which in the past formed relatively self-sufficient and autonomous entities (they were named under vath, arribèra « valley » ou d'estrem « excentred valley ») :

La Vath Surguèra (prononcé 'Bat surguère')  A small valley on the left bank at the entrance of the Lavedan which groups the towns of Ségus, Aspin-en-Lavedan, Ossen, Omex, Viger.

L'estrem de Castèth-lobon (pronounced 'Casteth Loubou') or Castelloubon  which corresponds to the Néez basin, located on Cheust and Ourdis-Cotdoussan (the name comes from Castellum Lupi  "Wolf castle", founded by the first count of the Lavedan, Mansion Loup of the Loup dynasty from which dukes of Gascony and counts of Bigorre were born, at the beginning of the 10th century, the viscounts' residence until the beginning of the 11th century, it comprises the towns of Juncalas, Geu, Ger, Lugagnan, Saint-Créac (which today includes Antalos and Justous), Ousté, Berbérust-Lias, Ourdis-Cotdoussan, Germs-sur-l'Oussouet, Cheust, Gazost, Ourdon.

L'estrem de Sala ou Estrèm de Salles  Argelès (formerly Ourout and Vieuzac, which became Argelès-Gazost in 1897), Ayzac-Ost, Agos-Vidalos, Ouzous, Salles, Sère-en-Lavedan, Gez.

The val d'Azun  constituted of the Arren and Estaing valleys as well as the Bergons and the right bank of the high valley of l'Ouzoum, comprises the villages of Arrens, Marsous, Aucun, Gaillagos, Arcizans-Dessus, Arras-en-Lavedan, Sireix, Bun, Estaing, Arbéost, Ferrières (including Hougarou).

Le Davant-Aiga (pronounces Dabant-Aygues = East of the waters)  It correspond to the eastern bank of the gave du Lavedan and includes the towns of Préchac, Boô-Silhen (including Asmets), Saint-Pastous (including Senta-Maria), Ayros-Arbouix, Vier-Bordes, Artalens-Souin, Beaucens, Villelongue (including Ortiac).

L'arribèra de Sent Savin ou Rivière de Saint-Savin  Saint-Savin, Lau-Balagnas, Adast, Pierrefitte-Nestalas, Soulom, Uz, Cauterets, Arcizans-Avant.

The Barèja valley (French 'Barège') named « Pays Toy »  Luz-Saint-Sauveur, Sassis, Sazos, Grust, Saligos, Chèze, Viscos, Vizos, Esquièze-Sère, Esterre, Viella, Betpouey, Barèges, Sers, Viey, Gèdre, Gavarnie.

Hydrography 
The Lavedan corresponds to the Gave de Pau bassin, upstream from Lourdes namely with the valleys of the Gave de Gavarnie, the Gave de Cauterets and the Gave d'Azun.

Delimitation 
The Lavedan communicates with the vallée de Campan (vallée de l'Adour) by the col du Tourmalet and with the vallée d'Ossau by the cirque du Litor (east of col d'Aubisque ; the left bank of the vallée de l'Ouzom is part of Ossau while the right bank is part of the val d'Azun). It is separated from Aragon by the France–Spain border, traversable by numerous mountain passes.

Main sites 
The main towns are Argelès-Gazost, Pierrefitte-Nestalas, Cauterets, Luz-Saint-Sauveur, Gèdre and Gavarnie.

The major mountain sites are :
 Vignemale
 Pic de Néouvielle (Neuvielha)
 Cirque de Gavarnie
 Lac de Gaube
 Pont d'Espagne

Notes and references 

Pyrenees
Valleys of France
Landforms of Hautes-Pyrénées